Raghubir Singh may refer to:
 Raghubir Singh (photographer) (1942–1999), Indian photographer
 Raghubir Singh (equestrian), Indian equestrian
 Raghubir Singh Jind (1834–1887), Raja of Jind of the Phulkian dynasty
 Raghubir Singh Bundi (1869–1927), Raja of Bundi

See also
 Raghbir Singh Bhola (1928–2019), Indian field hockey player